Hans Peter Mayr (born 27 November 1944) is an Austrian sprint canoer who competed in the late 1970s and early 1980s. He was eliminated in the semifinals of the K-2 1000 m event at the 1976 Summer Olympics in Montreal. Four years later in Moscow, Mayr was eliminated in the semifinals of the K-4 1000 m event.

References
Sports-Reference.com profile

1944 births
Austrian male canoeists
Canoeists at the 1976 Summer Olympics
Canoeists at the 1980 Summer Olympics
Living people
Olympic canoeists of Austria